Mina Vahid (born 8 July 1980) is an Iranian actress. In her first experience in 2008, this actor started acting in the movie Atash-e Sabz directed by Mohammad Reza Aslani. She is known for her acting in Time to Love (2015), Shahrzad (2015–2016), One Night in Tehran (2019) and Maple (2021).

Career
Mina Vahid made her cinematic debut in 2008 with the movie The Green Fire and has since appeared in more than 20 cinematic and television and Theater projects.

She demonstrated her talent with her performance in the movie Time to Love .The film was nominated for 10 Crystal Simorghs at the 33rd Fajr Film Festival. in 2020 she won the Best Lead Actress award for One Night in Tehran in 13th Annual Iranian Film Festival – San Francisco.

Filmography

Film

Web

Television

Awards and nominations

See also 
 Iranian women
 Iranian cinema
 Fajr International Film Festival

References

External links
 
 

Living people
1980 births
People from Rasht
People from Tehran
Iranian film actresses
Iranian stage actresses
Iranian television actresses